"Sound of Madness" is a single by American rock band Shinedown from their 2008 album The Sound of Madness and is also the album's title track, despite the exclusion of the word "the" in the song's title. The song was chosen to be the title track after some road testing on a short run of dates. It was released on February 23, 2009, in Europe. The song peaked at No. 1 on the Mainstream Rock Tracks chart, making it their third straight single to reach the top spot on the chart. This made Shinedown the only band to have their first 10 singles all reach the top five on the Mainstream Rock chart. It also reached No. 5 on the Modern Rock Tracks chart, making it the band's fourth top ten hit and third top five hit.

Track listing

Charts

Weekly charts

Year-end charts

Certifications

References

Shinedown songs
2009 singles
Songs written by Brent Smith
Song recordings produced by Rob Cavallo
Songs written by Dave Bassett (songwriter)
2008 songs
Atlantic Records singles

American heavy metal songs